Yaroslav Popovych (born 4 January 1980) is a Ukrainian former professional cyclist, who rode professionally between 2002 and 2016.

Upon joining  in 2005, his focus switched to the Tour de France, where he won the young riders' classification in 2005 and won stage 12 in 2006. From 2012 until 2016 he rode with the UCI ProTour team .

Career

Early years 
Popovych was born in Drohobych, Ukrainian SSR, Soviet Union. He was considered one of the most promising cyclists while riding in junior and under-23 races after catching 35 victories in 2000 and 2001. He won the Under-23 Men's road race in the 2001 UCI Road World Championships after finishing second the previous year. He also won the Paris–Roubaix edition for under-23 riders and palio del recioto. The Ukrainian turned pro in 2002 by joining the Belgian team  and delivered some strong showings, most notably in the Giro d'Italia where he finished third in 2003 and fifth in 2004, when he wore the pink jersey during three stages.

Discovery Channel Pro Cycling Team (2005–07)
In this same year, Popovych took one of his best victories by winning the Volta a Catalunya, which is an important race before the Tour de France. Along with the rest of the Discovery team, he won stage four team time trial in the Tour de France and showed his potential by winning the young rider classification, while helping Armstrong win his seventh Tour de France at the time.

In the 2006 Tour de France, Popovych was considered one of the Discovery Channel team's four leaders, along with José Azevedo, Paolo Savoldelli and George Hincapie. After failing to be among the best for the overall classification in the Pyrenees mountain stages, Popovych won stage 12 by repeatedly attacking his fellow break-away compatriots Alessandro Ballan, Óscar Freire and Christophe Le Mével. During 2006 season he also won stages at the Vuelta a Castilla y León and Tour de Georgia, where he finished third.

Popovych mainly worked as a domestique during 2007 season, aiding Alberto Contador to win Paris–Nice and the Tour de France. Early in the season, he won the fifth stage in Paris–Nice after attacking  from the finishing line. He was considered as the team leader for the Giro d'Italia, but he withdrew in the twelfth stage after suffering two crashes in the race. In the Tour de France, he finished eighth while working for Discovery Channel team-mates Contador and Levi Leipheimer.

Silence–Lotto (2008) 
In 2008, Popovych moved to  squad after  announced that it would cease operations at the end of 2007.

Popovych was recruited as a domestique member of the Tour de France team primarily to support lead rider Cadel Evans, but had a rather disappointing year, with only a 3rd place in Paris–Nice to show for. At the end of the year, it was announced he would team up with his former Discovery manager Johan Bruyneel again in 2009, joining the new  team.

Astana (2009) 

In 2009, Popovych and Armstrong joined the Kazakh-based cycling squad , where many other former Discovery Channel riders and staff were also under contract. Popovych acted as a domestique for Contador in Paris–Nice, finishing 23rd himself.

Team RadioShack (2010) 
In 2010 Popovych followed many former Astana riders to the newly created American based squad .

Doping allegations 
In January 2011 Popovych was incriminated in the Floyd Landis doping allegations against the  cycling team, after Sports Illustrated magazine reported that in November 2010 his property in Tuscany had been searched by Federal Officials who discovered drug testing documents, medical supplies and performance-enhancing drugs as well as evidence of links to controversial Italian physician Michele Ferrari. Later that day Popovych denied the allegations.

Major results

2000
 1st Overall Tour de Nouvelle-Calédonie
 1st Gran Premio di Poggiana
 2nd Road race, UCI Under-23 Road World Championships
 2nd Giro del Belvedere
 3rd Piccolo Giro di Lombardia
 10th Trofeo Alcide Degasperi
2001
 1st  Road race, UCI Under-23 Road World Championships
 1st Trofeo Banca Popolare di Vicenza
 1st Giro del Belvedere
 1st Gran Premio Palio del Recioto
 1st Paris–Roubaix Espoirs
 2nd Overall Grand Prix Guillaume Tell
 2nd Gran Premio della Liberazione
 2nd Trofeo Alcide Degasperi
 4th GP Open Campania
 9th GP Città di Napoli
2002
 1st Poreč Trophy II
 1st GP de Genève
 3rd Poreč Trophy III
 4th Overall Brixia Tour
 4th Gran Premio Fred Mengoni
 5th Poreč Trophy I
 6th Overall Tour de Wallonie
 9th Overall Tour de l'Avenir
 10th Tre Valli Varesine
2003
 3rd Overall Giro d'Italia
 3rd Overall Tour de Wallonie
 5th Overall Settimana Internazionale di Coppi e Bartali
 6th Coppa Ugo Agostoni
 7th Overall Tour de Romandie
 7th Giro della Provincia di Lucca
 9th Overall Giro della Liguria
 10th Giro dell'Emilia
2004
 1st Trofeo Androni Giocattoli
 5th Overall Giro d'Italia
Held  Maglia Rosa for Stages 13–16
 8th Overall Regio-Tour
 9th Overall Tour of Austria
 10th Firenze–Pistoia
2005
 1st  Overall Volta a Catalunya
 4th LuK Challenge Chrono (with Paolo Savoldelli)
 Tour de France
1st  Young rider classification
1st Stage 4 (TTT)
2006
 1st Stage 12 Tour de France
 1st Stage 2 (ITT) Vuelta a Castilla y León
 3rd Overall Tour de Georgia
1st Stage 2
 4th GP Ouest–France
2007
 1st Stage 5 Paris–Nice
 8th Overall Tour de France
Stage 9 Combativity award
2008
 3rd Overall Paris–Nice
2009
 1st Stage 4 (TTT) Tour de France
2013
 9th Gent–Wevelgem

Grand Tour general classification results timeline

References

External links 

 
 
 

1980 births
Living people
Ukrainian male cyclists
Ukrainian Tour de France stage winners
Olympic cyclists of Ukraine
Cyclists at the 2004 Summer Olympics
Cyclists at the 2008 Summer Olympics
People from Drohobych
Sportspeople from Lviv Oblast
21st-century Ukrainian people